EDX London was a derivatives exchange managed by the London Stock Exchange that was absorbed into the Turquoise trading platform in 2011. The market was set up in 2003 to combine the liquidity and expertise of the LSE with advanced derivatives technology offered by Sweden's OMX AB. Members of EDX could trade either standardized or flexible futures and options on indices or single stocks. Trading took place on the three Scandinavian linked exchanges, the Stockholm Stock Exchange, Copenhagen Stock Exchange, and Oslo Børs as well as some Russian stocks.

The exchange utilised the electronic trading platform Sola Trading and trades were cleared via LCH.Clearnet.  At its peak, there were approximately 150 contracts available for trading.

The cooperation between EDX London and OMX was terminated in November 2009 when Nasdaq took over OMX.  Most of the contracts were moved to Nasdaq OMX with only the Norwegian derivatives remaining with EDX London.  NasdaqOMX moved these contracts to its Genium Inet electronic trading platform in 2010.  The LSE merged the remaining EDX London contracts with its Turquoise trading service that it had acquired in 2009.

References

External links
 EDX London - Website of the EDX London

Financial services companies of the United Kingdom
London Stock Exchange
Defunct companies of the United Kingdom
2009 disestablishments in the United Kingdom
British companies disestablished in 2009
2003 establishments in the United Kingdom